Niromi Sanoja Bibile (born December 27, 1961), is an actress in Sri Lankan cinema and television. She started her career with dramatic roles and moved to comedy roles. Sanoja is well known for the roles Mali Nandani in the TV series Nonavaruni Mahathvaruni and Miss Kitty in the 1996 movie Cheriyo Darling.

She is a winner of Miss Sri Lanka pageant.

Personal life
His father Sumith Bibile was an actor appeared in films such as Umathu Wishwasaya and Asoka. Sumith was born on 30 November 1930 in Kandy and died on 5 September 2017. He was educated in Dharmaraja College. Her mother was Nandanie Dehigama. Sanoja completed her education from Girls' High School, Kandy.

On 4 November 2019, she met with an accident at 8. 45 am on Deans Road, Maradana and was hospitalized with minor injuries.

Career
She started cinema career with the 1987 film Mangala Thegga directed by H.D. Premaratne. Her notable cinema came through Awaragira, Cheriyo Darling, Ra Daniel Dawal Migel 3 and Supiri Andare. In 2000, she entered film production with the film Alu Yata Gini.

She acted in the new music video Ashokamala sung by Sunil Malawana.

Selected television serials

 Aswenna
 Charitha Dekak
 Class Sinhala Class
 Dangamalla 
 Dedunu Sihina
 Deweni Gamana 
 Ganga Addara Kele
 Hapanaa
 Indrachapa 
 Nonavaruni Mahathvaruni
 Oba Mageya
 Raja Bhavana
 Shaun
 Sihinayak Paata Paatin * Sivu Diyadahara

Controversy
In 2012, the husband of the Chief Medical Officer (CMO) of the Kataragama hospital allegedly threatened Bibile with a sword after a heated argument had erupted between the two during Bibile went to the hospital to obtain treatment for an urgent illness. With the incident, chief medical officer has been transferred to the Middeniya Rural Hospital with immediate effect.

On 29 November 2015, while attending to pay her last respects to actress Damitha Saluwadana in Boralesgamuwa, Bibile's glass shutters of the car has been broken and stolen  Rs. 32,000 in cash, a mobile phone worth Rs. 30,000 and jewelry worth Rs. 3.5 million. She immediately complaint about the burglary and Piliyandala police started the investigations.

Filmography

References

External links
 Sanoja's love appeal
 Controversial chat with Sanoja
 Song and a Sari
 Thattaya comes forward for a worthy cause
 Sanoja talks about lesbian scene in black and white era
 Alu Yata Gini : A novel cinematic experience
 We got out of it

Living people

1961 births

Sri Lankan film actresses

Alumni of Girls' High School, Kandy